Michaël Henry Ciani (born 6 April 1984) is a French former professional footballer who played as a centre back.

Club career
His performances during the 2008–09 season led to increased speculation that Ciani would sign with another club with the player preferring a move to the Premier League over Ligue 1 contenders Bordeaux and Paris Saint-Germain.

On 28 July 2009, Ciani and Bordeaux reached an agreement on a four-year contract with the Aquitaine-based club paying Lorient €4 million for his services. The defender was recruited by Laurent Blanc as a replacement for the departed Souleymane Diawara who joined Marseille.

On 18 July 2015, Ciani reached an agreement on a two-year contract with Sporting CP after his three-year contract with Lazio ended. Roughly one month later, however, he signed a two-year deal with RCD Espanyol.

On 31 August 2016, after only three matches for the Pericos, Ciani rescinded his contract.

On 2 September 2017, Ciani was signed by MLS club LA Galaxy as a free agent. Ciani scored his first goal for the Galaxy against FC Dallas on 22 October 2017. Ciani was released by LA Galaxy at the end of their 2018 season.

On 20 October 2019, 35-year old Ciani announced his retirement.

International career
Ciani made his international debut for France in 2010.

References

External links

1984 births
Living people
Association football defenders
French footballers
France under-21 international footballers
France international footballers
French people of Guadeloupean descent
AJ Auxerre players
CS Sedan Ardennes players
FC Lorient players
LA Galaxy players
Major League Soccer players
Racing Club de France Football players
R. Charleroi S.C. players
FC Girondins de Bordeaux players
Ligue 1 players
S.S. Lazio players
Serie A players
Sporting CP footballers
La Liga players
RCD Espanyol footballers
French expatriate footballers
French expatriate sportspeople in Belgium
French expatriate sportspeople in Italy
French expatriate sportspeople in the United States
French expatriate sportspeople in Portugal
French expatriate sportspeople in Spain
Expatriate footballers in Belgium
Expatriate footballers in Italy
Expatriate footballers in Portugal
Expatriate footballers in Spain
Expatriate soccer players in the United States